Tonjua Harris Williams is an American academic and the current President of St. Petersburg College in St. Petersburg, Florida.

Biography
A St. Petersburg native, Williams began her career at the St. Petersburg College in 1986 after earning her bachelor's degree in Humanities from Clearwater Christian College. She earned another bachelor's degree in Business Administration from Clearwater Christian, then a master's degree in Counselor Education from the University of South Florida, and a Ph.D. in Higher Education from Barry University.

Prior to being selected to be the seventh president of the college, Dr. Williams worked as a Coordinator for Student Support Services, Sr. Vice President for Student Services, Vice President for Academic and Student Affairs and Provost at the College's Tarpon Springs campus. During that time, she initiated and oversaw several successful programs, including The College Experience student success initiative, which expanded partnerships between faculty and advisors, created an early alert system for struggling students and increased student visits to campus learning support centers.

Professional organizations
President Williams is an Aspen Presidential Fellow, a coach for the American Association of Community College's (AACC) Guided Pathways initiative, a faculty resident for the Community College Center for Student Engagement (CCCSE) institutes and is affiliated with several state and national organizations, often in leadership roles.

Her present affiliations include:

 Achieving the Dream (ATD) Advisory Network Committee, 2016–present
 American Association of Community College's President's Round Table, Member, 2011–present
 Admiral Farragut Academy, Executive Board Member, 2014–present
 Council for Student Affairs, Florida College System, Region 4, 2012 – present
 City of St. Petersburg 2020 Plan Education Sub-committee Chair, 2015–present
 Mt. Zion Human Services Board, Board Chair, 2012–present
 National Council of Negro Women, Member, 2012–present
 Some past affiliations include:
 PACE School for Girls, Board Member, 2014-2016
 State of Florida Student Activities Committee, Member-at-Large, 2013-2016
 Pinellas County Education Foundation, 2011-2012
 Pinellas Education Foundation, Executive Board Member, 2009-2010
 Tarpon Springs Chamber of Commerce, Executive Board, 2008-2009
 St. Petersburg Free Clinic, Executive Board Member, 2014-2015
 Mayor's Transition Team, Community Member, 2013
 Lakewood Jr. Spartans Youth Association, Inc., President, 2009-2012
 Boys & Girls Club of America, Executive Board Member, 2011-2012
 Pinellas Village, Board Member, 2006-2007
 Hospice Minority Advisory Board, Member, 2004-2005
 Southside Tabernacle Baptist Church, Youth Group leader, 1997-2000
 Pinellas County Schools, Youth Motivator/Mentor, 1999-2001

Awards and recognitions
President Williams is esteemed in her work on national, state and local levels, and has won many awards, including:

 Employer Support of Guard and Reserve (affiliate of the Department of Defense) Patriot Award, 2016
 Academy Preparatory School, Five Fabulous Females, 2014
 Chamber of Commerce, Iconic Woman of the Year Finalist for Large Businesses, 2013
 Network of Executive Women, Exceptional Woman of the Year Finalist, 2013
 Junior Achievement, Educator of the Year, 2011
 Top 25 Women in Higher Education by Diverse: Issues In Higher Education magazine 
 2017 Businesswoman of the Year, Government/Nonprofit category, The Tampa Bay Business Journal 
 Impact Award, The Weekly Challenger
 The Pinellas Opportunity Council, President’s Award for Community Leadership
 National Coalition of 100 Black Women, Passing the Torch Leadership Award for Education

References

Living people
St. Petersburg College faculty
University of South Florida alumni
Barry University alumni
Year of birth missing (living people)